Volodymyr Ivanovych Duran (born 1 November 1998) is a Ukrainian professional footballer who plays as a central midfielder for Ukrainian club Uzhhorod.

Personal life
Volodymyr is the son of Ukrainian politician from Zakarpattia Oblast and president of Uzhhorod Ivan Duran.

References

External links
 
 
 

1998 births
Living people
Place of birth missing (living people)
Ukrainian footballers
Association football midfielders
FC Uzhhorod players
Ukrainian First League players
Ukrainian Second League players
Ukrainian Amateur Football Championship players